Aglossa disciferalis is a species of snout moth in the genus Aglossa. It was described by Harrison Gray Dyar Jr. in 1908. It is found in North America.

The wingspan is about 18 mm.

References

Moths described in 1908
Pyralini
Moths of North America